Alison Hulme  is a Scottish chemist and Professor of Synthesis and Chemical Biology. Her research considers natural products and synthesis. She was elected Fellow of the Royal Society of Edinburgh and awarded the Royal Society of Chemistry Bader Award in 2021.

Early life and education 
Hulme became interested in chemistry as a child. Her grandfather was a metallurgist at Procter & Gamble and her mother was a high school biology teacher. She spent her childhood doing experiments at home, and particularly enjoyed being able to play with microscopes. She was a member of the UK team at the International Chemistry Olympiad. Hulme eventually studied Natural Sciences at the University of Cambridge. After graduating in Hulme started a doctoral research programme with Ian Paterson. She worked as a research fellow with Albert I. Meyers at Colorado State University. In 1994 Hulme returned to the University of Cambridge, where she was appointed a Hertha Ayrton Fellow at Girton College, Cambridge.

Research and career 
Hulme was appointed a lecturer at the University of Edinburgh, where she was promoted to a Personal Chair in 2017. Her research combines chemical biology and medical science to synthesise and make use of natural products.

Hulme was awarded the Royal Society of Chemistry Bader Award for her efforts in label-free Raman imaging. Label-free Raman imaging, or Stimulated Raman scattering, can be used to identify the location of drugs in biological cells. These imaging techniques can be used to diagnose and treat cancer, as well as improving pre-clinical modelling of drug candidates.

Awards and honours 

 2015 Elected President of the Royal Society of Chemistry Organic Division Council 
 2021 Elected Fellow of the Royal Society of Edinburgh
 2021 Royal Society of Chemistry Bader Award

Select publications

Personal life 
Hulme is a mother of twins.

References 

Living people
Scottish women chemists
Fellows of the Royal Society of Edinburgh
Alumni of the University of Cambridge
Year of birth missing (living people)